The  is a mostly underground rapid transit line in Japan operated by the third sector operating company Saitama Railway Corporation. Funded by Saitama Prefecture, local municipal governments, and Tokyo Metro, it forms a continuation of the Tokyo Metro Namboku Line, starting at Akabane-iwabuchi Station in Tokyo and ending at Urawa-Misono Station in Saitama. The line is used as the main means of transportation to Saitama Stadium 2002. On 27 November 2015, the route was nicknamed the "Saitama Stadium Line". The line symbol used in the station numbering is "SR".

Overview 
This line allows trains from the Tokyo Metro Namboku Line to operate beyond Akabane-iwabuchi Station into Saitama Prefecture and ending at Urawa-Misono Station.

Most of the line is underground, only Urawa Misono Station and adjacent depots are on the surface. It connects the eastern and northern part of Kawaguchi to Tokyo; areas that were previously only served by buses. 

Planning for the line stated in 1972 as an extension of the Tokyo Metro Namboku Line. The original alignment was planned to serve eastern Urawa and central Kawaguchi in Saitama. In 1985, the alignment was shifted east to Hatogaya. In 1992, the third sector Saitama Railway Corporation was established by Saitama Prefecture, and construction began in 1995. The line opened on 28 March 2001, ahead of the 2002 FIFA World Cup, which held several matches at the Saitama Stadium, half an hour on foot from the terminating Urawa-Misono Station.

The total cost of construction is 256.1 billion yen, making the cost per kilometer at 17.5 billion yen. Since its opening, the line used six-car trains with all stations (except Urawa-Misono Station) equipped with platforms long enough support future expansion into eight-car trains. Urawa-Misono Station was built as a temporary terminal as the line was planned to be extended further north in the future so it only has platforms long enough for six car trains.

A further northern extension beyond Urawa Misono Station connecting Iwatsuki Station of the Tobu Urban Park Line and Hasuda Station of the JR Utsunomiya Line (Tohoku Line) is currently being proposed.

Stations

Rolling stock
 Saitama Rapid Railway 2000 series 6-car EMUs
 Tokyo Metro 9000 series 6-car EMUs
 Tokyu 3000 series 6/8-car EMUs
 Tokyu 3020 series 8-car EMUs
 Tokyu 5080 series 8-car EMUs
 Sotetsu 21000 series 8-car EMUs

Shareholders
As of 2013, the main shareholders in Saitama Railway Corporation are as follows.

Ridership
Ridership figures for the line are as follows.

History
The third sector company, Saitama Railway Corporation, was established on 25 March 1992.

The entire line from Akabane-Iwabuchi to Urawa-Misono opened on 28 March 2001. 

On 1 April 2022, eight-car trains began operating on the line.

Future developments
In the future, the line may be extended north from Urawa-Misono through Iwatsuki-ku, Saitama to Hasuda Station (in Hasuda, Saitama) on the JR East Utsunomiya Line, but financial problems have prevented construction of the extension.

See also
 List of rapid transit systems

References

External links

  
 Saitama Prefectural Government information 

Railway lines in Japan
1067 mm gauge railways in Japan
Railway lines opened in 2001
Underground rapid transit in Japan
Japanese third-sector railway lines
2001 establishments in Japan
Railway lines in Tokyo
Rail transport in Saitama Prefecture